Justin von Linde (7 August 1797, Brilon – 9 June 1870) was a German jurist and statesman from the Grand Duchy of Hesse.

References

1797 births
1870 deaths
People from Brilon
Members of the Frankfurt Parliament
People from the Grand Duchy of Hesse
University of Münster alumni
University of Göttingen alumni
University of Bonn alumni
Academic staff of the University of Giessen